Li Kangyong is a Paralympian athlete from China competing mainly in category F46 long jump events.

He competed in the 2008 Summer Paralympics in Beijing, China. There he won a bronze medal in the men's F46 long jump event.

References

Paralympic athletes of China
Athletes (track and field) at the 2008 Summer Paralympics
Paralympic bronze medalists for China
Chinese male long jumpers
Living people
Year of birth missing (living people)
Medalists at the 2008 Summer Paralympics
Paralympic medalists in athletics (track and field)
21st-century Chinese people